Zaucha is a Polish surname. Notable people with the surname include:

 Andrzej Zaucha (disambiguation), multiple people
 Patryk Zaucha (born 2000), Polish footballer

See also
 

Polish-language surnames